Ashikuzzaman is a major general of Bangladesh Army and the Ambassador of Bangladesh to Kuwait.

Early life 
Ashikuzzaman has a Masters of Defence Studies and another in Strategic Studies from the National University, Bangladesh.

Career 
Ashikuzzaman joined Bangladesh Army as a commissioned officer in 1988.

Ashikuzzaman has served in United Nations Mission in Sierra Leone, United Nations Operation in Côte d'Ivoire, and MONUSCO. He worked at the National Defence College as the Senior Directing Staff.

On 13 July 2020, Ashikuzzaman was appointed the Ambassador of Bangladesh to Kuwait. He replaced, S.M. Abul Kalam, who had faced criticism for links to Mohammad Shahid Islam.

References 

Bangladesh Army generals
Ambassadors of Bangladesh to Kuwait
Living people
Year of birth missing (living people)
National Defence College (Bangladesh) alumni
Bangladesh Army officers